James Gordon Bennett Jr. (May 10, 1841May 14, 1918) was publisher of the New York Herald, founded by his father, James Gordon Bennett Sr. (1795–1872), who emigrated from Scotland. He was generally known as Gordon Bennett to distinguish him from his father. Among his many sports-related accomplishments he organized both the first polo match and the first tennis match in the United States, and he personally won the first trans-oceanic yacht race. He sponsored explorers including Henry Morton Stanley's trip to Africa to find David Livingstone, and the ill-fated USS Jeannette attempt on the North Pole.

Bennett's controversial reputation is thought to be the inspiration behind the phrase "Gordon Bennett!", used as an expression of incredulity.

Early life
Bennett was born on May 10, 1841, in New York City to James Gordon Bennett Sr. (1795–1872), the founder, editor and publisher of the New York Herald.  He was the only son in the family. He grew up mostly in France, and attended the École Polytechnique.

Career
In 1861, he moved to the United States, and enlisted in the Union Navy. In 1867, under his father's tutelage, he founded The Evening Telegram, an entertainment and gossip paper that later became the New York World-Telegram. On January 1, 1867, the elder Bennett turned control of the Herald over to him. Bennett raised the paper's profile on the world stage when he provided the financial backing for the 1869 expedition by Henry Morton Stanley into Africa to find David Livingstone in exchange for the Herald having the exclusive account of Stanley's progress.

In 1872, he commissioned a Manhattan building design from Arthur D. Gilman, who popularized Second Empire and cast-iron facades. The building still exists, on Nassau Street. Though he sold it in 1889 and it was greatly expanded over the following five years, it continues to be known as The Bennett Building. It was built on a site previously occupied by the Herald's offices and printing plant, and the Herald later moved back into it. In 1890, he commissioned a new Herald building at Sixth and Broadway, completed in 1895.

In 1880, Bennett established international editions of his newspaper in Paris and London; their successor is the New York Times' International Edition, previously known as the International Herald Tribune. In 1883, he partnered with John W. Mackay to found the Commercial Cable Company. It was a successful business and provided an additional large income to Bennett.

Lifestyle
Bennett, like many of his social class, indulged in the "good life":  yachts, opulent private railroad cars, and lavish mansions. He was the youngest Commodore ever of the New York Yacht Club. Bennett became Commodore of the N.Y.Y.C in 1870 at the completion of Henry G. Stebbins's term, which was from 1863 to 1870.

Yachts

In 1861, Bennett volunteered his newly built schooner yacht, Henrietta, for the U.S. Revenue Marine Service during the Civil War.   At the same time, Bennett was commissioned as a third lieutenant in the Revenue Marine Service (equivalent to an ensign in the U.S. Navy) and assigned to the U.S. Marine Revenue schooner Henrietta (the yacht he had loaned to the U.S. Government) beginning in June 1861.  She patrolled Long Island until February 1862 when she was sent to Port Royal, South Carolina.  On March 3, 1862, Bennett commanded the Henrietta as part of the fleet which captured Fernandina, Florida.  Bennett and the Henrietta returned to civilian life in New York in May 1862.

In 1866, on a bet, he won the first trans-oceanic yacht race. The race was between three American yachts, the Vesta (owned by Pierre Lorillard IV), the Fleetwing (owned by George and Frank Osgood) and the Henrietta. Each yachtsman put up $30,000 in the winner-take-all wager. They started off of Sandy Hook, New Jersey, on 11 December 1866 amid high westerly winds and raced to The Needles, the furthest westerly point on the Isle of Wight, famous for its lighthouse.  Bennett's Henrietta won with a time of 13 days, 21 hours, 55 minutes.

In April 1867, Bennett purchased the yacht L'Hirondelle for $75,000 from Bradford. In May 1867, Bennett refitted the L'Hirondelle and change her name to the Dauntless. She was rebuilt and rigged as a schooner. Bennett added 23 feet to her length. Her new dimensions changed to 121 feet; 25-foot beam and 299-tons.

He entertained guests aboard his steam-yacht "Namouna". American expatriate artist Julius LeBlanc Stewart painted several works set on the yacht.

On May 11, 1870, the pilot boat James Gordon Bennett, No. 6, was launched from the Lawrence & Foulks shipyard at  Williamsburg. At the launch and naming ceremony, Katie Chapman, daughter of Captain Daniel C. Chapman, gave the boat the name James Gordon Bennett.

Bennett presented the cup and prizes at the October 14, 1873, New York Yacht Club, Cape May Challenge Cup  regatta, which was a race from Owl's Head Point around to Cape May Lighthouse in New Jersey, and back to the Sandy hook Lightship.

Scandal
Bennett often scandalized society with his flamboyant and sometimes erratic behavior. In 1877, he left New York for Europe after an incident that ended his engagement to socialite Caroline May. According to various accounts, he arrived late and drunk to a party at the May family mansion, then urinated into a fireplace (some say grand piano) in full view of his hosts.

Bennett's controversial reputation is thought to have inspired, in Britain, the phrase "Gordon Bennett!" as an expression of incredulity.

Move to Paris
Settling in Paris, he launched the Paris edition of the New York Herald, named the Paris Herald, the forerunner of the International Herald Tribune. He backed George W. De Long's voyage to the North Pole on the USS Jeannette via the Bering Strait.

The ill-fated expedition led to the deaths from starvation of DeLong and 19 of his crew, a tragedy that increased the paper's circulation.  He was a co-founder of the Commercial Cable Company, a venture to break the Transatlantic cable monopoly held by Jay Gould. The 2014 nonfiction book In The Kingdom of Ice written by  historian Hampton Sides recounts the voyage and Bennett's role as a financier of the expedition.

Return to the US
Bennett returned to the United States and organized the first polo match in the United States at Dickel's Riding Academy at 39th Street and Fifth Avenue in New York. He helped found the Westchester Polo Club in 1876, the first polo club in America. He established the Gordon Bennett Cup for international yachting and the Gordon Bennett Cup for automobile races. In 1906, he funded the Gordon Bennett Cup in ballooning (Coupe Aéronautique Gordon Bennett), which continues to this day. In 1909, Bennett offered a trophy for the fastest speed on a closed circuit for airplanes. The 1909 race in Rheims, France was won by Glenn Curtiss for two circuits of a 10 km rectangular course at an average speed of 46.5 miles per hour (74.8 km/h). From 1896 to 1914, the champion of Paris, USFSA football (soccer), received a trophy offered by Gordon Bennett.

Personal life
He did not marry until he was 73. His wife was Maud Potter, widow of George de Reuter, son of Julius Paul Reuter, founder of Reuters news agency. He died on May 14, 1918, in Beaulieu-sur-Mer, Alpes-Maritimes, France. Bennett is buried at the Cimetière de Passy in Paris.

James Stillman was an intimate friend of James O. Bloss and John William Sterling. After the death of Bennett it was learned by the administrators of his estate that he had appointed Stillman one of the administrators and trustees. Stillman had little or no opportunity to act under the authority of Bennett's will, as he died a few weeks after Bennett's death. Stillman named Sterling one of his executors. Sterling could hardly have begun his duties under Stillman's will when he too died suddenly. The Bennett estate, the Stillman estate and the Sterling estate totaled about $76,000,000. After Sterling's death it was learned that he had appointed his long time intimate companion, Bloss, one of the executors. A few weeks after Sterling's death, Bloss died.

Honors
Asteroid 305 Gordonia is named after him. He also has a street named for him near Chopin Airport in Warsaw, Poland. The Avenue Gordon Bennett in Paris, where the French Open's Stade de Roland Garros is sited is named after his father. Bennett, British Columbia, now a ghost town, as well as nearby Bennett Lake and Bennett Peak are named for him.

Gallery

References

Further reading
 Crockett, Albert Stevens (1926) When James Gordon Bennett was Caliph of Bagdad Funk & Wagnalls, New York, 
 Seitz, Don Carlos (1928) The James Gordon Bennetts, Father and Son, Proprietors of the New York Herald Bobbs-Merrill, Indianapolis, ; reissued in 1974 by Beekman Publishers
 O'Connor, Richard (1962) The Scandalous Mr. Bennett Doubleday, Garden City, New York, 
 Cane, André (1981) James Gordon Bennett: Hôte Prestigieux et Fantasque de la Côte d'Azur (James Gordon Bennett: Prestigious and Eccentric Host of the Riviera) B. de Gourcez, Saint-Paul-de-Vence, in French

 Jefferson, Sam (2016) 'Gordon Bennett and the First Yacht Race Across the Atlantic'. Publisher: Bloomsbury Publishing
Roethof, Guikje (2018) Gordon Bennett! Uitgeverij Aspekt, Soesterberg, OCLC 1026502787, in Dutch.

External links
 
 Bennett family history 
 

19th-century American newspaper publishers (people)
1841 births
1918 deaths
American expatriates in France
American male journalists
American male sailors (sport)
American people of Scottish descent
American polo players
Burials at Passy Cemetery
Businesspeople from New York City
Jeannette expedition
Members of the New York Yacht Club
People of New York (state) in the American Civil War
Union Navy officers
James Gordon Jr.